Nandicius is a genus of spiders in the family Salticidae. It was first described in 2016 by Jerzy Prószyński. , it contains 7 Asian species.

Taxonomy
The genus Nandicius was one of a number of new genera erected by Jerzy Prószyński in 2016, largely for species formerly placed in Pseudicius. Prószyński placed Nandicius in his informal group "chrysillines". In Wayne Maddison's 2015 classification of the family Salticidae, the tribe Chrysillini is part of the Salticoida clade of the subfamily Salticinae.

Species
Nandicius comprises the following species:
 Nandicius cambridgei (Prószyński & Zochowska, 1981) –   Central Asia, China
 Nandicius deletus (O. Pickard-Cambridge, 1885)  – China  
 Nandicius frigidus (O. Pickard-Cambridge, 1885) –    Afghanistan, Pakistan, India, China 
 Nandicius kimjoopili (Kim, 1995)  –  Korea, Japan 
 Nandicius mussooriensis (Prószyński, 1992) –  India 
 Nandicius pseudoicioides (Caporiacco, 1935)  –  Himalayas 
 Nandicius szechuanensis (Logunov, 1995) – China

References

Salticidae
Salticidae genera
Spiders of Asia